Saint Benignus of Armagh (died 467) was the son of Sesenen, an Irish chieftain in the part of Ireland that is now called as County Meath. He was baptised into the Christian faith by St. Patrick, and became his favourite disciple and his coadjutor in the Diocese of Armagh around AD 450. His gentle disposition suggested the name Benen, which was Latinised as Benignus.

He followed his master in his travels and assisted him in his missionary labours, helping in the formation of choral services. His family may have belonged to the bardic order. From his musical achievements he was known as "Patrick's psalm-singer". As Benignus had been trained by Patrick in sacred learning from his youth and was well versed in the language and learning of his native land, he was appointed secretary to the Commission of Nine, which a few years before had been directed to compile the Brehon Laws.

Benignus is said to have contributed materials for the Psalter of Cashel, and the Book of Rights. He succeeded St. Patrick's nephew Sechnall as coadjutor and became the first rector of the Cathedral School of Armagh.

He was present at the synod that passed the canon recognising "the See Of the Apostle Peter" as the final court of appeals in difficult cases. This canon is to be found in the Book of Armagh. St. Benignus resigned his coadjutorship in 467 and died the same year. His feast is celebrated on 9 November.

In 433, Patrick clashed with King Laoghaire at Tara over religion. Legend reports that a trial by fire was proposed. A pagan druid and Benignus were tied inside a burning timber building, the former was reduced to ash while Benignus was untouched, at this turning point, Christian teaching was established.

Most authorities identified St. Patrick's psalm-singer with the St. Benignus who founded Kilbannon, near Tuam. However, Tirechán's collections in the Book of Armagh states that St. Benignus of Kilbannon was the son of Lugni of Connaught. St. Benignus of Kilbannon had a famous monastery, where St. Jarlath was educated, and he presided over Drumlease. His sister Mathona served as Abbess of Tawney, in Tirerrill.

In Cavan, he established a monastery on Drom Benen (hill of Benan), today's Drumbannon. Other monasteries are in cill benen (church of Benan), today's Kilbonane, West Cork.

See also
Teampull Bheanáin

References

Further reading
 
Dumville, David N. "Auxilius, Iserninus, Secundinus and Benignus." In Saint Patrick, AD 493-1993, ed. by David N. Dumville and Lesley Abrams. Studies in Celtic history 13. Woodbridge: Boydell, 1993. pp. 89–105. .

467 deaths
5th-century Christian saints
Medieval Irish saints
People from County Meath
5th-century Irish bishops
Year of birth unknown
Converts to Christianity from pagan religions
People of Conmaicne Dúna Móir
Bishops of Armagh